Frankie & Benny's (now trading as Frankie's) is a chain of Italian-American-themed restaurants in the United Kingdom run by The Restaurant Group. , it had 90 outlets nationwide.

History

In 1924, at the age of 10, Frankie Giuliani left Sicily with his parents and moved to Little Italy in New York City. Within a year of moving, the family had opened a restaurant, everybody helping with the building and the cooking in equal measure. Frankie went to the nearby high school and became lifelong friends with Benny, already a third-generation American. The restaurant was taken over by Frankie and Benny in 1953. It combines popular American food with traditional Italian dishes.

In 2016, 33 under-performing restaurants were disposed of. Then, In January 2017, The Restaurant Group attempted to reinvent the brand. In 2019, another 18 branches were disposed of and, in February 2020, The Restaurant Group announced that further disposals were planned to take place by the end of 2021.

In 2019, it was reported that virtual restaurant brands Birdbox and Stacks were operating on delivery services Deliveroo and Uber Eats from Frankie & Benny's restaurants.

Seven new vegan dishes were added to the menu in January 2020.

On 3 June 2020, during the COVID-19 pandemic in the United Kingdom, The Restaurant Group told employees a "large number" of its Frankie & Benny's outlets would not reopen after quarantine; 120 restaurants were disposed of.

In October 2021, the chain shortened its name to "Frankie's". The chain hoped that by reinventing itself and changing its menu again, it could attract more customers and open new locations.

In March 2023, the chain announced it would dispose of 35 more restaurants due to the current cost of living crisis. Up to 3 restaurants would be converted into Wagamama's, and their aim is to reduce the total number of restaurants from 90 to 65 by 2024.

Controversy
In October 2012, a two-year-old was served whisky instead of lime and water. The chain apologised, saying that they would prevent anything similar from happening again, but any preventative measures seemed to have failed when, in December 2017, an alcoholic drink was served to a four-year-old girl in the Warrington branch. A spokesman for the chain apologised for the incident which was described as "genuine human error".

In May 2014, a Frankie & Benny's customer complained after he was served a crab dish containing surimi. The item was eventually removed from the menu.

In November 2015, the chain was given the lowest rating (red) in an assessment of the sustainability of its seafood products.

References

External links

Official website

Italian restaurants in the United Kingdom
Restaurants established in 1995
Restaurant groups in the United Kingdom